Juan Brotto (27 November 1939 – 29 January 2009) was an Argentine cyclist. He competed in the team pursuit at the 1960 Summer Olympics.

References

External links
 

1939 births
2009 deaths
Argentine male cyclists
Olympic cyclists of Argentina
Cyclists at the 1960 Summer Olympics
Sportspeople from Padua
Pan American Games medalists in cycling
Pan American Games silver medalists for Argentina
Cyclists at the 1963 Pan American Games
Cyclists from the Province of Padua